Theophilos the Indian (died 364), also called "the Ethiopian", was an Aetian or Heteroousian bishop who fell alternately in and out of favor with the court of the Roman emperor Constantius II. He is mentioned in the encyclopedia Suda.

Originally from Socotra or the island of Divus which could be the Maldive Islands in the Indian Ocean, or an island near the mouth of the Indus. He came to the court of Constantine I as a young man and was ordained a deacon under the Arian bishop Eusebius of Nicomedia. He was later exiled because Constantius believed him to be a supporter of Constantius' rebellious cousin Gallus. Famed for his ability as a healer, Theophilus was later recalled to court to heal Constantius' wife, the empress Eusebia, which he is reputed to have done successfully. He was exiled again for his support of the disfavored theologian Aëtius whose Anomoean doctrine was an offshoot of Arianism.

Theophilus was ordained a bishop  and around 354 AD, Emperor Constantius II sent Theophilus on a mission to south Asia via Arabia, where he is said to have converted the Himyarites and built three churches in southwest Arabia. He is also said to have found Christians in India.
In about 356, the Emperor Constantius II wrote to Ezana of the Kingdom of Aksum requesting him to replace the then Bishop of Aksum Frumentius with Theophilos, who supported the Arian position, as did the Emperor. This request was ultimately turned down.

On his return to the empire he settled at Antioch.

One of the churches which Theophilus had founded in Arabia during the 4th century was built at Zafar, Yemen and likely destroyed in 523 by the King of Himyar Dhu Nuwas, who had shifted the state religion from Christianity to Judaism. Later in 525, Theophilus' church was restored by the Christian King Kaleb of Axum following his successful invasion on Himyar.

References

Further reading

364 deaths
Arian bishops
4th-century bishops
4th-century Romans
4th-century births
Maldivian Christian missionaries
Christian missionaries in Yemen